Kobyly is a municipality and village in Liberec District in the Liberec Region of the Czech Republic. It has about 400 inhabitants.

Administrative parts
Villages and hamlets of Havlovice, Janovice, Podhora, Radvanice, Sedlisko and Vorklebice are administrative parts of Kobyly.

History
The first written mention of Kobyly is from 1239.

Sights
Architecturally valuable buildings are the Chapel of Saint Wenceslaus in Kobyly from 1900, and the Chapel of Saint Gall in Havlovice from 1888.

References

External links

Villages in Liberec District